Stratená is a village and municipality in the Rožňava District in the Košice Region of middle-eastern Slovakia.

History
In historical records the village was first mentioned in 1723, so it is one of the newest villages in Roznava District.

Geography
The village lies at an altitude of 860 metres and covers an area of 35.361 km2.
It has a population of about 140 people.

References

External links
Stratená

Villages and municipalities in Rožňava District